Pileanthus bellus is a plant species of the family Myrtaceae endemic to Western Australia.

It blooms between October and December producing pink flowers.

It is found on sand dune in the Gascoyne and Mid West regions of Western Australia near Northampton and Shark Bay where it grows in sandy soils over sandstone.

References

bellus
Plants described in 2002
Taxa named by Gregory John Keighery
Endemic flora of Western Australia